Mashbury is a small village and civil parish in the Chelmsford district of Essex, England. The population of the village is included in the civil parish of Pleshey.

External links 

Mashbury church on www.essexchurches.info

Villages in Essex
Civil parishes in Essex